Tokarnia  (Tokarnia), village in East Małopolska in the Lesser Beskid mountains, Bukowsko rural commune. It is in the Subcarpathian Voivodship (since 1999), previously in Krosno Voivodship (1975–1998) and Sanok district.

History

Tokarnia was founded in 1526 by Herburt. From 1340-1772 (Ruthenian Voivodeship) and from 1918-1939 Tokarnia was part of Poland. While during 1772-1918 it belonged to Austrian empire, later Austrian-Hungarian empire when double monarchy was introduced in Austria. This part of Poland was controlled by Austria for almost 120
years. At that time the area (including west and east of Subcarpathian Voivodship) was known as Galicia.

Religion
In Tokarnia there used to be a Greek Catholic parish church, the church of St. Michael the Archangel (formerly called the church of The Most Blessed Virgin Mary). The wooden church was built and blessed in 1785. In this year the parish had a congregation of 280 Greek Catholics, which went up to 612 by 1936. The church was destroyed in 1946 by the UPA.

The Roman Catholic parish for Tokarnia was located in Bukowsko. It's diocesan was located in Przemyśl. The Roman Catholic Archdiocesan Archives in Przemyśl has some records for Tokarnia, however they are of a different time period.

Literature
 Adam Fastnacht, Nagórzany [in:] Slownik Historyczno-Geograficzny Ziemi Sanockiej w Średniowieczu (Historic-Geographic Dictionary of the Sanok District in the Middle Ages), Kraków, (II edition 2002), .
Jerzy Zuba "W Gminie Bukowsko". Roksana, 2004, . Translated by Deborah Greenlee. Arlington, TX 76016.

International Relations

Twin towns
Tokarnia is twinned with:
 Drocourt in France

References

External links
Geographical Dictionary of the Kingdom of Poland and other Slavic Lands Słownik geograficzny Królestwa Polskiego i innych krajów słowiańskich.  Warszawa. 1876. (digital edition)

Tokarnia
Populated places established in 1526